Kari Hautala (10 March 1973 – 5 July 2016) was a Finnish basketball player.

The  Hautala played his whole SM-sarja career for Torpan Pojat winning three Finnish championships and three Finnish Cup championships. He also played three seasons with ToPo at the EuroCup/Saporta Cup achieving Round of 16 in 1997–98 season at best and capped 15 times for Finland men's national team. Hautala was awarded as Korisliiga Defensive Player of the Year in 1998 and Korisliiga Sixth Man of the Year in 1994 and 1998.

Hautala died of heart attack on 5 July 2016 at 43 years of age.

Sources

References

1973 births
2016 deaths
Finnish men's basketball players
Sportspeople from Helsinki
Torpan Pojat players